Super Shastri is a 2012 Indian Kannada-language action comedy film directed by Raviraj and produced by G. Ramachandran. It stars Prajwal Devraj and Haripriya in the lead roles. The film is a remake of the 2007 Telugu comedy film Seema Sastri starring Allari Naresh and Farzana. Rangayana Raghu, Umashree, Bullet Prakash and Rekha Kumar among others play the supporting roles. Deva is the score and soundtrack composer.

Cast
 Prajwal Devraj as Subramanya Sastry
 Haripriya as Soumya
 Umashree
 Rangayana Raghu
 Bullet Prakash
 Pallakki Radhakrishna as Venkatappa Gowda
 Ambika Soni
 Master Manju
 Master Suresh
 Rekha Kumar
 Kote Prabhakar
 Suresh wadageri

Soundtrack
The soundtrack is composed by Deva to the lyrics of K. Kalyan.

Reception 
A critic from The Times of India scored the film at 2.5 out of 5 stars and says "Though Prajwal has done a good job, he does not fit the role. Haripriya impresses with her glamorous look. Pallakki Radhakrishna has done a good job as villain. Less said the better about the rest". Srikanth Srinivasa from Rediff.com scored the film at 1 out of 5 stars and wrote "Kashi Vishwanath's camera work is shoddy. Deva's music is nothing much to write about. Director Ravi Raj has neither understood the language nor has he got a grip on the narrative. The film manages to raise barely a few laughs. It lacks comic timing and punchy dialogues. It is better to stay clear from this intolerable film". Y Maheswara Reddy from DNA wrote "Her dialogue delivery deserves appreciation in particular. Saving grace comes only in the form of Deva’s music. Don’t think too much before giving this film a miss, is our final verdict!". A critic from Bangalore Mirror wrote  "Prajwal looks good and varies his voice for the two different getups well. He has matured, but unfortunately his films have not. He better choose his future films well. Along with Haripriya, he makes a good pair on the screen. What is lacking are good film makers to tap such potential".

References

2012 films
2010s Kannada-language films
2012 action comedy films
Kannada remakes of Telugu films
Films scored by Deva (composer)
Indian action comedy films
2012 comedy films